Pedoptila is a genus of moths in the family Himantopteridae.

Species
 Pedoptila catori Bethune-Baker, 1911
 Pedoptila nemopteridia Butler, 1885
 Pedoptila nigrocristata Joicey & Talbot, 1921
 Pedoptila thaletes Druce, 1907
 Pedoptila ubangiana Schultze, 1931

References

Himantopteridae
Zygaenoidea genera